Klemm's sign, also known as air cushion sign, is a sign of chronic appendicitis.

References

Radiologic signs
Gastroenterology